Thiago is the Portuguese equivalent of the names Jacob and James. It is the archaic spelling of the name Tiago, presently mostly used in Brazil; in Portugal, the modern spelling largely prevails.

Thiago (footballer, born September 1988), full name Thiago de Lima, Brazilian football midfielder
Thiago (footballer, born October 1988), full name Thiago Pinto Borges, Brazilian football midfielder
Thiago de Los Reyes (born 1989), Brazilian television and film actor
Thiago Alcântara (born 1991), Brazilian-Spanish professional football player, known simply as Thiago
Thiago Alves (tennis) (born 1982), Brazilian tennis player
Thiago Alves (fighter) (born 1983), Brazilian mixed martial artist
Thiago Soares Alves (born 1986), Brazilian volleyball player
Thiago Cionek (born 1986), Polish-Brazilian football player
Thiago Corrêa (born 1982), Brazilian football player
Thiago Monteiro (table tennis) (born 1981), Brazilian table tennis player
Thiago (footballer, born February 1983), Brazilian football defender
Thiago (footballer, born November 1983), Brazilian football striker
Thiago Monteiro (tennis) (born 1994), Brazilian tennis player
Thiago Maia (born 1997), Brazilian football player
Thiago Motta (born 1982), Brazilian football player
Thiago Neves (born 1985), Brazilian football player
Thiago Quirino (born 1985), Brazilian football player
Thiago Ribeiro (born 1986), Brazilian football player
Thiago Santos (disambiguation), various people 
Thiago Silva (born 1984), Brazilian football player 
Thiago (footballer, born 1991) (Thiago Lima da Silva), Brazilian football player
Thiago (footballer, born 1996)
Thiago (footballer, born 1997)
Thiago (footballer, born 2001)
Thiago Silva (fighter) (born 1982), Brazilian mixed martial artist
Thiago Seyboth Wild (born 2000), Brazilian tennis player

See also
Tiago (disambiguation)
Diego
Jacob

Brazilian given names
Surnames from given names